The Conquest of al-Hasa was achieved by the Saudi forces of ibn Saud with support from the Ikhwan in April 1913. The Oasis of al-Hasa was conquered from an Ottoman garrison, who had controlled the area since 1871.

The Shia religious community leaders of al-Hasa negotiated a surrender and recognition of the Saudi political authority in exchange for leniency and religious freedom, which was granted at the time by Ibn Saud.   
  
The Ottomans swiftly acknowledged the loss of al-Hasa, and recognized al-Hasa and Nejd as being under the rule of Ibn Saud.

See also
List of modern conflicts in the Middle East

References

History of Saudi Arabia
1913 in Saudi Arabia
Conflicts in 1913
Wars involving Saudi Arabia
Violence against Shia Muslims in Saudi Arabia